In algebra, given a differential graded algebra A over a commutative ring R, the derived tensor product functor is

By definition, it is the left derived functor of the tensor product functor .

Derived tensor product in derived ring theory 
If R is an ordinary ring and M, N right and left modules over it, then, regarding them as discrete spectra, one can form the smash product of them:

whose i-th homotopy is the i-th Tor:
.
It is called the derived tensor product of M and N. In particular,  is the usual tensor product of modules M and N over R.

Geometrically, the derived tensor product corresponds to the intersection product (of derived schemes).

Example: Let R be a simplicial commutative ring, Q(R) → R be a cofibrant replacement, and  be the module of Kähler differentials. Then

Then, for each R → S, there is the cofiber sequence of S-modules

The cofiber  is called the relative cotangent complex.

See also 
derived scheme (derived tensor product gives a derived version of a scheme-theoretic intersection.)

Notes

References 
Lurie, J., Spectral Algebraic Geometry (under construction)
Lecture 4 of Part II of Moerdijk-Toen, Simplicial Methods for Operads and Algebraic Geometry
Ch. 2.2. of Toen-Vezzosi's HAG II

Algebraic geometry